Pablo Peirano Pardeiro (born 21 January 1975) is a Uruguayan football manager and former player who played as a midfielder. He is the current manager of Peruvian side Cusco FC.

Playing career
Peirano was born in Montevideo, and was a Danubio youth graduate. After making his senior debut with the club, he established a career in the country's first division (aside from a short period in Colombian side Centauros Villavicencio in 2003), representing Tacuarembó, Racing Club Montevideo, Paysandú, Cerro, Juventud and Boston River, where he retired at the age of 35.

Managerial career
Immediately after retiring, Peirano started working as Juan Verzeri's assistant in the Uruguay under-20 national team. After Verzeri left the national side, Peirano worked as Gerardo Pelusso's assistant at Nacional, Independiente Santa Fe, and Al-Arabi.

On 3 May 2017, Peirano was named manager of former side Racing Club Montevideo. He resigned on 7 December, and took over another club he represented as a player, Danubio, on 20 December.

On 13 December 2018, Danubio announced Peirano's departure after his contract ended. The following 2 June, he replaced Jorge Soto at the helm of Peruvian side Carlos A. Mannucci, but still left on 28 November.

On 13 March 2020, Peirano returned to Mannucci in the place of Juan Manuel Llop.

References

External links

1975 births
Living people
Footballers from Montevideo
Uruguayan footballers
Association football midfielders
Danubio F.C. players
Tacuarembó F.C. players
Racing Club de Montevideo players
Paysandú F.C. players
C.A. Cerro players
Juventud de Las Piedras players
Boston River players
Centauros Villavicencio footballers
Uruguayan expatriate footballers
Uruguayan expatriate sportspeople in Colombia
Expatriate footballers in Colombia
Uruguayan football managers
Uruguayan Primera División managers
Racing Club de Montevideo managers
Danubio F.C. managers
Uruguayan expatriate football managers
Uruguayan expatriate sportspeople in Qatar
Uruguayan expatriate sportspeople in Peru
Expatriate football managers in Peru
Carlos A. Mannucci managers
Cusco FC managers